{{DISPLAYTITLE:C6H6O}}
The molecular formula C6H6O (molar mass: 94.11 g/mol, exact mass: 94.0419 u) may refer to:

 Oxanorbornadiene (OND)
 Oxepin
 Phenol, or carbolic acid